The 2004 European Parliament election in Austria was the election of MEP representing Austria constituency for the 2004–2009 term of the European Parliament. It was part of the wider 2004 European election. The vote took place on 13 June.

The parties of the left, the Austrian Social Democratic Party and the Greens, improved their share of the vote. The ruling conservative party, the Austrian People's Party, also improved its share, but this was at the expense of its coalition partner, the Austrian Freedom Party, whose vote dropped sharply. The anti-corruption campaigner Hans-Peter Martin polled strongly and his list won two seats.

Results

Austria
European Parliament elections in Austria
Europe